The Province of New Hampshire was a colony of England and later a British province in New England. The name was first given in 1629 to the territory between the Merrimack and Piscataqua rivers on the eastern coast of North America, and was named after the county of Hampshire in southern England by Captain John Mason, its first named proprietor. In 1776 the province established an independent state and government, the State of New Hampshire, and joined with twelve other colonies to form the United States.

Europeans first settled New Hampshire in the 1620s, and the province consisted for many years of a small number of communities along the seacoast, Piscataqua River, and Great Bay.  In 1641 the communities were organized under the government of the Massachusetts Bay Colony, until Charles II issued a colonial charter for the province and appointed John Cutt as President of New Hampshire in 1679.  After a brief period as a separate province, the territory was absorbed into the Dominion of New England in 1686. Following the collapse of the unpopular Dominion, on October 7, 1691 New Hampshire was again separated from Massachusetts and organized as an English crown colony. Its charter was enacted on May 14, 1692, during the coregency of William and Mary, the joint monarchs of England, Scotland, and Ireland.  Between 1699 and 1741, the province's governor was often concurrently the governor of the Province of Massachusetts Bay.  This practice ended completely in 1741, when Benning Wentworth was appointed governor. Wentworth laid claim on behalf of the province to lands west of the Connecticut River, east of the Hudson River, and north of Massachusetts, issuing controversial land grants that were disputed by the Province of New York, which also claimed the territory.  These disputes resulted in the eventual formation of the Vermont Republic and the U.S. state of Vermont.

The province's economy was dominated by timber and fishing.  The timber trade, although lucrative, was a subject of conflict with the crown, which sought to reserve the best trees for use as ship masts. Although the Puritan leaders of Massachusetts ruled the province for many years, the New Hampshire population was more religiously diverse, originating in part in its early years with refugees from opposition to religious differences in Massachusetts.

From the 1680s until 1760, New Hampshire was often on the front lines of military conflicts with New France and the Abenaki people, seeing major attacks on its communities in King William's War, Dummer's War, and King George's War.  The province was at first not strongly in favor of independence, but with the outbreak of armed conflict at Lexington and Concord many of its inhabitants joined the revolutionary cause.  After Governor John Wentworth fled New Hampshire in August 1775, the inhabitants adopted a constitution in early 1776.  Independence as part of the United States was confirmed with the 1783 Treaty of Paris.

Before colonization
Prior to English colonization, the area that is now northeastern New England was populated by bands of the Abenaki, who lived in sometimes-large villages of longhouses.  Depending on the season, they would either remain near their villages to fish, gather plants, engage in sugaring, and trade or fight with their neighbors, or head to nearby fowling and hunting grounds; later they also farmed tobacco and the "three sisters": corn, beans, and squash.  The seacoast was explored in the early years of the 17th century by English and French explorers, including Samuel de Champlain and John Smith.

Early English settlement
Permanent English settlement began after land grants were issued in 1622 to John Mason and Sir Ferdinando Gorges for the territory between the Merrimack and Sagadahoc (Kennebec) rivers, roughly encompassing present-day New Hampshire and western Maine.  Settlers, whose early leaders included David Thomson, Edward Hilton and his brother William Hilton, began settling the New Hampshire coast as early as 1623, and eventually expanded along the shores of the Piscataqua River and the Great Bay.  These settlers were mostly intending to profit from the local fisheries.  Mason and Gorges, neither of whom ever came to New England, divided their claims along the Piscataqua River in 1629.  Mason took the territory between the Piscataqua and Merrimack, and called it "New Hampshire", after the English county of Hampshire.

Conflicts between holders of grants issued by Mason and Gorges concerning their boundaries eventually led to a need for more active management.  In 1630, Captain Walter Neale was sent as chief agent and governor of the lower settlements on the Piscataqua (including Strawbery Banke, present-day Portsmouth), and in 1631 Captain Thomas Wiggin was sent to govern the upper settlements, comprising modern-day Dover, Durham and Stratham.    After Mason died in 1635, the colonists and employees of Mason appropriated many of his holdings to themselves. Exeter was founded in 1638 by John Wheelwright, after he had been banished from the neighboring Massachusetts Bay Colony for defending the teachings of Anne Hutchinson, his sister-in-law.  In the absence of granting authority from anyone associated with the Masons, Wheelwright's party purchased the land from local Indians.  His party included William Wentworth, whose descendants came to play a major role in colonial history.  Around the same time, others unhappy with the strict Puritan rule in Massachusetts settled in Dover, while Puritans from Massachusetts settled what eventually became Hampton.

Because of a general lack of government, the New Hampshire settlements sought the protection of their larger neighbor to the south, the Massachusetts Bay Colony.  In 1641, they collectively agreed to be governed from Massachusetts, provided the towns retained self-rule, and that Congregational Church membership was not required for their voters (as it was in Massachusetts).  The settlements formed part of that colony until 1679, sending representatives to the Massachusetts legislature in Boston.  Mason's heirs were in the meantime active in England, seeking to regain control of their territory, and Massachusetts was coming under increasing scrutiny by King Charles II.  In 1679 Charles issued a charter establishing the Province of New Hampshire, with John Cutt as its first president.

First royal charters
In January 1680 Cutt took office, ending Massachusetts governance.  However, Cutt and his successor, Richard Waldron, were strongly opposed to the Mason heirs and their claims.  Consequently, Charles issued a second charter in 1682 with Edward Cranfield as governor.  Cranfield strongly supported the Mason heirs, making so many local enemies in the process that he was recalled in 1685.  In 1686 the territory was brought into the Dominion of New England, an attempt to unify all of the New England colonies into a single government.  The New Hampshire towns did not suffer as much under the rule of Sir Edmund Andros as did Massachusetts.  After word of the Glorious Revolution reached Boston, Massachusetts authorities conspired to have Andros arrested and sent back to England.  This left the New Hampshire towns without any colonial administration, just as King William's War erupted around them.  Subjected to significant French and Indian raids, they appealed to Massachusetts Governor Simon Bradstreet, who oversaw them until William III and Mary II issued new, separate charters in 1691 for both Massachusetts and New Hampshire.

1691 charter
Samuel Allen, a businessman who had acquired the Mason claims, was appointed the first governor under the 1691 charter.  He was equally unsuccessful in pursuing the Mason land claims, and was replaced in 1699 by the Earl of Bellomont.  Bellomont was the first in a series of governors who ruled both New Hampshire and the Province of Massachusetts Bay.  Until 1741 the governorships were shared, with the governor spending most of his time in Massachusetts.  As a result, the lieutenant governors held significant power.  The dual governorship became problematic in part because of territorial claims between Massachusetts and New Hampshire.  Since the southern border of the original Mason grant was the Merrimack River, and the Massachusetts charter specified a boundary three miles north of the same river, the claims conflicted, and were eventually brought to the king's attention.  In 1741, King George II decreed what is now the border between Massachusetts and New Hampshire, and separated the governorships, issuing a commission to Benning Wentworth as New Hampshire governor.

Wentworth broadly interpreted New Hampshire's territorial claims, believing that territories west of the Connecticut River belonged to New Hampshire.  In a scheme that was effective at lining his own pockets, he sold land grants in this territory for relatively low prices, but required parts of the grants to be allocated to himself.  These grants brought New Hampshire into conflict with the Province of New York, the other claimant to the territory. King George III in 1764 ruled in New York's favor, setting off a struggle between the holders of the New Hampshire Grants and New York authorities that eventually resulted in the formation of the state of Vermont.  The controversy also resulted in the replacement of Wentworth by his nephew John, who would be the last royal governor of the province.

Since the province was on the northern frontier bordering New France, its communities were frequently attacked during King William's War and Queen Anne's War, and then again in the 1720s during Dummer's War.  Because of these wars the Indian population in the northern parts of the province declined, but settlements only slowly expanded into the province's interior. The province was partitioned into counties in 1769, later than the other twelve colonies that revolted against the British Empire.

American Revolution
Twelve other colonies joined with New Hampshire in resisting attempts by the British Parliament to impose taxes. After the American Revolutionary War began in April 1775, the province recruited regiments that served in the Siege of Boston, and was the first former European colony to formally establish an independent government, as the State of New Hampshire, in January 1776.

Demographics

From 1630 to 1780, the population of New Hampshire grew from 500 to 87,802. In 1623, the first permanent English settlements, Dover and Rye, were established, while Portsmouth was the largest city by 1773 with a population of 4,372. The black population in the colony grew from 30 in 1640 to 674 in 1773 (ranging between 1 and 4 percent of the population), but declined to 541 (or 0.6 percent of the population) by 1780.

In New Hampshire, unlike some of the other New England Colonies, the Puritan Congregational church was not the established church in the colony. Following the First Great Awakening (1730–1755), the number of regular places of worship in New Hampshire had grown to 46 in 1750 (40 Congregational, five Presbyterian, and one Anglican), and to 125 regular places of worship by 1776 (78 Congregational, 27 Presbyterian, 13 Baptist, four Friends, two Episcopal, and one New Light Congregational).

See also
 List of colonial governors of New Hampshire

Notes

References

 Belknap, Jeremy. The History of New Hampshire (1791–1792) 3 vol. classic history

 Daniell, Jere. Colonial New Hampshire: A History (1982)
 Morison, Elizabeth Forbes and Elting E. Morison. New Hampshire: A Bicentennial History (1976)
 Squires, J. Duane. The Granite State of the United States: A History of New Hampshire from 1623 to the Present (1956)

 
1629 establishments in the British Empire
1679 establishments in the British Empire
1689 establishments in the British Empire
1641 disestablishments in the British Empire
1686 disestablishments in the British Empire
1776 disestablishments in the British Empire
Colonial United States (British)
Dominion of New England
Former British colonies and protectorates in the Americas
Pre-statehood history of New Hampshire
States and territories established in 1629
States and territories disestablished in 1641
States and territories established in 1679
States and territories disestablished in 1686
States and territories established in 1689
States and territories disestablished in 1776
Thirteen Colonies